World Book Day, also known as World Book and Copyright Day or International Day of the Book, is an annual event organized by the United Nations Educational, Scientific and Cultural Organization (UNESCO) to promote reading, publishing, and copyright. The first World Book Day was celebrated on 23 April in 1995, and continues to be recognized on that day. A related event in the United Kingdom and Ireland is observed in March. On the occasion of World Book and Copyright Day, UNESCO along with the advisory committee from the major sectors of the book industry, select the World Book Capital for one year. Each designated World Book Capital City carries out a program of activities to celebrate and promote books and reading.

Date selection
The original idea was conceived in 1922 by Vicente Clavel, director of Cervantes publishing house in Barcelona, as a way to honour the author Miguel de Cervantes and boost the sales of books. It was first celebrated on 7 October 1926, Cervantes' birthday, before being moved to his death date, 23 April, in 1930. The celebration continues with great popularity in Catalonia, where it is referred to as Sant Jordi's Day or The Day of Books and Roses.

In 1995, UNESCO decided that the World Book and Copyright Day would be celebrated on 23 April, as the date is also the anniversary of the death of William Shakespeare and Inca Garcilaso de la Vega, as well as that of the birth or death of several other prominent authors. (In a historical coincidence, Shakespeare and Cervantes died on the same date—23 April 1616—but not on the same day, as at the time, Spain used the Gregorian calendar and England used the Julian calendar; Shakespeare actually died 10 days after Cervantes died, on 3 May of the Gregorian calendar.)

World Book Day by region

World Book Capital 
The World Book Capital (WBC) is an initiative of UNESCO which recognises cities for promoting books and fostering reading for a year starting on April 23rd, World Book and Copyright Day. Cities designated as UNESCO World Book Capital carry out activities with the aim of encouraging a culture of reading in all ages and sharing UNESCO's values.

UNESCO adopted the 31c/Resolution 29, in 2001, establishing the World Book Capital programme and naming Madrid as the first WBC city in 2001. The advisory committee is composed of UNESCO, the International Publishers Association, the International Federation of Library Associations and Institutions, the International Authors Forum and the International Booksellers Federation.

Spain 
In Spain, Book Day began to be celebrated since 1926 every October 7, the date that Miguel de Cervantes was believed to have been born. But, it was considered more appropriate to celebrate this day in a more pleasant season for walking and browsing the books in the open-air. Spring was much better than fall. So in 1930 King Alfonso XIII approved the change of celebration of the Book Day on April 23, the supposed date of the death of Cervantes.

Sweden 
In Sweden, the day is known as Världsbokdagen ("World Book Day") and the copyright aspect is seldom mentioned. Normally celebrated on 23 April, it was moved to 13 April in the year 2000 and 2011 to avoid a clash with Easter.

United Kingdom and Ireland 

In the United Kingdom and Ireland, World Book Day is a charity event in March, held annually on the first Thursday and coinciding with the release of special editions. The annual celebration on 23 April is World Book Night, an event organized by independent charity The Reading Agency.

United States 
In Kensington, Maryland, the International Day of the Book is celebrated with a street festival on the Sunday closest to 26 April. In 2020, the 15th Annual Kensington Day of the Book Festival was cancelled due to the COVID-19 pandemic.

India 
World Book Day is also celebrated in India on 23rd April every year. It is commemorated in many parts of India to encourage & aware of people for reading & publishing books. "Jeene ki Raah/Way of Living" is one of the most popular spiritual book of Saint Rampal JI Maharaj on google and social media platforms.

Gallery

See also
 International Children's Book Day
 World Intellectual Property Day
 Inventors' Day
 UN English Language Day
 World Storytelling Day

References

External links

World Book and Copyright Day, United Nations: 23 April
Message from Ms Audrey Azoulay, Director-General of UNESCO on the occasion of World Book and Copyright Day 2019
International Day of the Book celebration in Kensington, Maryland, US

April observances
Book promotion
Copyright law events
UNESCO
Reading (process)
Book Day
Recurring events established in 1995